Grossinger's Catskill Resort Hotel was a resort in the Catskill Mountains in the Town of Liberty, near the village of Liberty, New York. One of the largest Borscht Belt resorts, it was a kosher establishment that catered primarily to Jewish clients from New York City. After decades of activity and notable guests, it closed in 1986. Most of the buildings on site had been demolished by 2018, however a few remained in decrepit condition, and were destroyed in a fire in 2022. A feature documentary about the resort is being produced and scheduled for release in early 2024 by Executive Producers Harris Salomon of Atlantic Overseas Pictures Television and Robert Friedman of Bungalow Entertainment.

History

Asher Selig Grossinger moved from New York City to Ferndale in Sullivan County in the Catskill Mountains in the 1900s. There he rented rooms to visitors from New York City. His wife, Malka, operated the kosher kitchen, and Jennie Grossinger (1891–1972), his daughter, was the hostess. They called their home Longbrook House.

Reportedly, the Grossinger family offered a million dollars to rename the local New York, Ontario and Western Railway train station at Ferndale to "Grossingers", but were rebuffed by competing hoteliers. In 1952, Grossinger's earned a place in the history of skiing as the first resort in the world to use artificial snow.

During the years that the resort was operated by their daughter Jennie Grossinger, it expanded to over 35 buildings.  The main building contained an enormous dining room capable of seating 1,300 guests; under the dining room there was a vast, cavernous night club called the “Terrace Room". It had its own airstrip and post office. During his fighting days, Rocky Marciano would train at the resort. In 1972, Jennie died and the decline began. By the late 1970s and 1980s, resorts like Grossinger's or the Concord could no longer attract younger guests.

In August 1984, Grossinger's, in its dying years, promoted a Woodstock weekend to mark the 15th anniversary of the festival. It featured a workshop in tie-dyeing, a musical performance by David-Clayton Thomas, formerly of Blood, Sweat & Tears, a midnight showing of the four-hour documentary "Woodstock," and an appearance by John Sebastian, who advised, "Don't eat the purple tzimmes."  Abbie Hoffman, who was thrown off the Woodstock stage by Pete Townshend of The Who for making a political speech, was brought in by Grossinger's for the promotion.

Grossinger's may be most widely recognized as the Catskill resort that inspired "Kellerman's Mountain Resort" in the 1987 film Dirty Dancing.

In 1986, the Grossinger descendants sold the property to Servico. Grossinger's main hotel and main resort areas closed in 1986, but the golf course stayed open until 2017, and was kept maintained. The members of the golf clubhouse called the course "Big G". The golf course clubhouse was demolished in July 2018.    
Servico failed to reopen the hotel due to the massive costs associated with it. Numerous other companies also failed to accomplish the same feat. It was owned by Louis Cappelli as of September 2013, who was hoping for casinos to come to the area. The Concord Resort was part of the same deal.
Demolition of the remaining buildings on the resort started in summer 2018. The last building at Grossinger's was demolished on October 19, 2018.
One of the remaining buildings on the property burned to the ground on August 16, 2022.
In February 2019, a news report stated that Sullivan Resorts LLC intended to build a "$50 million resort with a 250 room hotel, convention centre, private residences and other amenities. Sullivan Resorts LLC was said to be "a subsidiary of owner Louis Cappelli’s Valhalla-based Cappelli Enterprises". The author of a news item in September 2019 did not seem as certain as to the long-term plan for the property.

Description

Like most Catskill resorts, Grossinger's grew over time, evolving from a Victorian hotel, later remodeled with Mission-style improvements,  through a Tudor-styled expansion in the 1940s and ending with the construction of Modernist-styled accommodations and entertainment facilities in the 1950s and 1960s. The original building, the former Nichols House, was designed by Frank Cottle, a local architect. Competition from nearby resorts drove the 1940s expansion, expanding the dining room on a large scale and creating the Terrace Room club and the Pink Elephant bar. The Terrace Room was expanded and renovated in 1949 by architect Morris Lapidus: one of his first hotel commissions.

See also
 Jewish country club

References

Further reading
Joel Pomerantz; Jennie And The Story Of Grossinger's (1970)
Tania Grossinger, "Growing Up at Grossinger's" (1975)
Richard Grossinger, "New Moon" (1996)

External links 
Grossinger's Golf and Country Club (still active)
Catskill Archive: Grossinger's Hotel
Jewish Virtual Library: Jennie Grossinger
Grossinger's Hotel Today
All Abandoned: Grossinger's Hotel in 2010

Borscht Belt
Defunct hotels in New York (state)
Golf clubs and courses in New York (state)
Resorts in New York (state)
Buildings and structures in Sullivan County, New York
Morris Lapidus buildings
Unused buildings in New York (state)
Demolished buildings and structures in New York (state)
Buildings and structures demolished in 2018